Ethan O'Donnell (born 1 January 1997) is an Irish Gaelic footballer who plays for Naomh Conaill and the Donegal county team.

He played for his county at minor, under-21 and senior level. He can play at half-back or half-forward.

O'Donnell scored the winning point for Donegal against Dublin in the 2014 All-Ireland Minor Football Championship semi-final. Aged 17 and a year younger than many of his teammates, he was used as an impact substitute during that campaign before starting the final against Kerry.

O'Donnell scored a goal in the 2017 Ulster Under-21 Football Championship final victory over Derry.

O'Donnell was involved with the county senior panel in the 2017 and 2020 seasons but did not play much in either season. He made a substitute appearance for Donegal against Kerry in the opening round of the 2017 National Football League. He did likewise in the last round of the delayed 2020 National Football League against the same opposition.

The 2021 season marked O'Donnell's breakthrough for his county team. He made a substitute appearance against Tyrone in the opening game of the 2021 National Football League. He also appeared in four of the six other games Donegal played (in a shortened season due to the COVID-19 pandemic). Then an injury to Peadar Mogan gave him the opportunity to play against Dublin in the National Football League semi-final. O'Donnell also started the 2021 Ulster Senior Football Championship quarter-final against Derry.

References
	

1997 births
Living people
Donegal inter-county Gaelic footballers
Gaelic football backs
Gaelic football forwards
Naomh Conaill Gaelic footballers